The following is a list of Israeli musical artists, singers and bands.

A 

 Omer Adam
 Ayal Adler
 Moshik Afia
 Aharit HaYamim (End of Days)
 Chen Aharoni
 Chava Alberstein
 Alon De Loco
 Jo Amar
 Etti Ankri
 Keren Ann
 Yardena Arazi
 Zohar Argov
 Meir Ariel
 Shlomo Artzi
 Asaf Amdurski
 Michal Amdurski
 The Apples
 Izhar Ashdot
 Astral Projection
 Astrix
 Gali Atari
 Gilad Atzmon
 Asaf Avidan
 Din Din Aviv

B 

 Ehud Banai
 Eviatar Banai
 Meir Banai
 Yossi Banai
 Yuval Banai
 Shlomo Bar
 Abatte Barihun (Abatte)
 Rami Bar-Niv
 Netta Barzilai
 Danni Bassan
 Batzal Yarok (Scallion)
 Beer7
 Zehava Ben
 Mosh Ben-Ari
 Amir Benayoun
 Dana Berger
 Yoni Bloch
 Yisrael Borochov
 David Broza

C 

 Matti Caspi
 The Churchills
 Anat Cohen
 Avishai Cohen, bassist
 Avishai Cohen, trumpeter
 Meytal Cohen
 Yizhar Cohen
 Riff Cohen

D 

 DAM
 Daklon
 Yair Dalal
 Shoshana Damari
 David D'Or
 Arkadi Duchin
 Dana International
 Duo Datz
 Roni Duani

E 
 Seffy Efrati
 Eifo HaYeled (Where's the Child)
 Arik Einstein
 Gad Elbaz
 Electrowavez
 Dudu Elharar
 Ethnix

F 
 Bradley Fish
 Dudu Fisher
 Rami Fortis

G 

 Nurit Galron
 Yehoram Gaon
 Aviv Geffen
 Yehonatan Geffen
 Eyal Golan
 Zion Golan
 Efrat Gosh
 Nathan Goshen
 Dan Gottfried
 Gidi Gov
 Dedi Graucher, Orthodox Jewish singer
 Shlomo Gronich
Amir Gwirtzman

H 

 The Brothers & the Sisters (Ha'achim veha'achayot)
 HaClique (The Clique)
 Sarit Hadad
 HaDag Nahash (The Snakefish)
 Hadorbanim (The Porcupines)
 HaGashash HaHiver (The Pale Tracker)
 Hagit Yaso
 HaHalonot HaGvohim (The High Windows)
 The Friends of Natasha
 Haivrit
 HaKol Over Habibi (Everything Passes, Habibi)
 Hamsa
 Hamuchtar
 Victoria Hanna
 Shalom Hanoch
 Yaron Hasson
 Israeli Andalusian Orchestra
 HaYehudim (The Jews)
 Ofra Haza
 Nechama Hendel
 Uzi Hitman
 Ariel Horowitz
 Harel Moyal

I 
 Ilanit
 Infected Mushroom
 Ishtar
 Ishay Ribo
 Idan Raichel

J 
 Noam Jacobson
 J.Viewz

K 
 Itzik Kala
 Mika Karni
 Katamine
 Shlomo Katz
 Kaveret (Beehive)
 Rami Kleinstein
 Rona Kenan
 Kerach Tesha (Ice Nine)
 Amir Kertes
 Knesiyat Hasekhel (Church of the Mind)
 Yael Kraus
 Kruzenshtern & Parohod, Russophone klezmer-rock band from Tel Aviv, created in 2002

L 

 Tzruya Lahav
 Daliah Lavi
 Oren Lavie
 Oshik Levi
 Yishai Levi
 Ivri Lider

M 

 Marbin
 Mashina
 Boaz Mauda
 Minimal Compact
 Miri Aloni
 MissFlag
 Monica Sex
 Haim Moshe
 Harel Moyal

N 

 Tamer Nafer
 Lior Narkis
 Ron Nesher
 Nikmat HaTraktor (The Tractor's Revenge)
 Achinoam Nini
 Offer Nissim
 Shy Nobleman

O 

 Esther Ofarim
 Orphaned Land
 Shaike Ophir
 Kobi Oz

P 

 Keren Peles
 Natalia Paruz
 Avi Peretz
 Kobi Peretz
 Inbal Perlmutter
 Eytan Pessen, pianist and opera director of the Semperoper
 Tzvika Pik
 Ravid Plotnik
 Yehuda Poliker
 Pharaoh's Daughter

Q 

 Nasreen Qadri

R 

 Idan Raichel
 Adi Ran
 Ras Deshen duo
 Yehudit Ravitz
 Yoni Rechter
 Rita
 Danny Robas
 Rockfour
 Pavlo Rosenberg

S 

 Sagol 59 (Purple 59)
 Berry Sakharof
 Daniel Salomon
 Sheygets
 Aris San
 Danny Sanderson
 Seek Irony
 Sfatayim (Lips)
 Shabak S
 Gene Simmons
 Avner Strauss
 Shlomi Shabat
 Boaz Sharabi
 Naomi Shemer
 Sheva (Seven)
 Shiri Maimon
 Shotei HaNvu'a (Fools of Prophecy)
 Ofir Shwartz
 Harel Skaat
 Skazi
 Malka Spigel
 Edna Stern (born 1977), pianist
 Subliminal

T 

 Pe'er Tasi
 Shimi Tavori
 Ninette Tayeb
 Teapacks
 Tislam
 Avi Toledano
 Margalit Tzan'ani
 Tzofei Tel Aviv
 The Voca People
 Totemo

U 
 Useless ID

V 
 Ilana Vered

Y 
 Yaffa Yarkoni
 Yitzhak Yedid
 Shefi Yishai
 Idan Yaniv

Z 
 Ziknei Tzfat (The Elders of Safed)
 Ariel Zilber
 Zino and Tommy

References 

Musical artists
Israeli